According to the Ayyavazhi sect of hinduism, Thretha Yukam was the fifth of the Eight Yukams. In this aeon   Isvaran created the fourth piece of the primordial Kroni as a Ten-headed mighty warrior, as per the request of Mayon, naming him as Ravanan, with ten heads as ten mountains. 

He oppressed all those living on earth by extracting Uliyam from them. He subdued all the earthly kings and made them pay tributes to him. Suffering under his oppression, Thevarkal sought the help of Lord Narayana, who for the purpose of destroying him, took birth as Raman. 

In his death-bed Ravanan was called to repent, which he neglected by saying: "Only with the help of my brother were you able to destroy me". With this episode of killing Ravanan, Thretha yukam came to an end.

See also
Hindu gods
Ayyavazhi mythology
List of Ayyavazhi-related articles
Treta Yuga

Ayyavazhi mythology
Eight Yugas